Culladia tonkinella is a moth in the family Crambidae. It was first described by Stanisław Błeszyński in 1970. It is found in Tonkin, and on Java and Sumatra.

References

Crambini
Moths described in 1970
Moths of Asia